Jean-Sébastien Rouillard (1789 in Paris – 1852) was a French portrait painter. A student of Jacques-Louis David, he exhibited at the Salon from 1817 onwards and gained many official commissions, notably for the musée de l'Histoire de France at the château de Versailles. He was awarded the Légion d'honneur. He married the miniature painter Françoise-Julie-Aldrovandine Lenoir, who died in the 1832 Paris cholera epidemic. They had two children, including the talented amateur painter Stéphanie (1822-1908), who in 1842 married the agronomist Victor Rendu. The Rouillard family tomb is in the first section of the first division of the cimetière du Montparnasse.

External links
Extract from Charles Gabe's dictionary of 19th century French artists
Rouillard's portrait of Juglar

1789 births
1852 deaths
French portrait painters
Painters from Paris
19th-century French painters
French male painters
Burials at Montparnasse Cemetery
19th-century French male artists
18th-century French male artists